

A grazing lunar occultation (also lunar grazing occultation, lunar graze, or just graze) is a lunar occultation in which as the occulted star disappears and reappears intermittently on the edge of the Moon. 
A team of many observers can combine grazes and reconstruct an accurate profile of the limb lunar terrain.  

Since graze paths rarely pass over established observatories, amateur astronomers use portable observing equipment and travel to sites along the shadow path limits. The goal is to report the UTC of each event as accurately as possible, and GPS disciplined devices are frequently used as the time-base.
Two methods are used to observe:
 visual – the observer has an audible UTC beeping device (e.g. a shortwave radio tuned to WWV) and an audio recorder (e.g. a tape recorder) and watches the target through the telescope, and calls 'Gone' when the star disappears, and 'Back' when the star reappears.  The audio recording is later analysed to extract the event times.
video – the observer uses a small video camera, usually mounted in the focuser of the telescope. A Video Time Inserter (VTI) is commonly used to insert a UTC time-stamp onto each frame of the recording. Either a camcorder, DVR or a laptop computer is used to record the video stream.  The video recording is later analysed to extract event times.

Such observations are useful for:
 refining knowledge of the positions and motions of stars
 examining limb topographical profile around the lunar polar region.
 Measurement of the Earth's rotation

See also
 Asteroid occultation
 Occultation
 Transit (occultations of planets by other planets)

References

Further reading
Grazing Lunar Occultations, Royal Astronomical Society of New Zealand, 
 </ref> and

External links
 , showing grazing occultation of Jupiter as seen from Melbourne, Australia
Astronomy Picture of Day for March 16, 2007, showing grazing occultation of Saturn 
International Occultation Timing Association Predicted paths for future grazing occultations
 Zodiacal Catalogue (XZ80Q) of stars that can be occulted by the moon 
 
Predictions and analysis of Lunar Occultations and Grazing Lunar Occultations. Occult (Software), Lunar Occultation Workbench (LOW) and GRAZEPREP

Astronomical events